

Introduction
FC Cortaillod are a football team from Switzerland who were recently relegated from the 2L Inter Group 2.

Current squad

Staff and board members
 President:  Marco Schild
 Vice President:  Cedric Guillod
 Treasurer :  Francois Cano
 Secretary :  Jessica Pacelli

External links
  Official Website 

Association football clubs established in 1955
Cortaillod
Cortaillod
1955 establishments in Switzerland